Kumar Nagarkoti (born 1974) is a Nepali writer, poet, and columnist. He is one of the most popular contemporary Nepali writer. He has published multiple books and is known for his use of surrealiastic style in his works.

Biography 
He was born on 2 December 1974 (17 Mangsir 2031 BS) in Lalitpur, Nepal.

He began his literary career in 1999 with an English poem titled Sorry Buddha, I Cannot Follow You. He published his first story, Nikash at the age of 21. The story was published in Sahakalam Sahitya, a literary paper that only printed works of established writers.

His first book, Mokshanta: Kathmandu Fever, a collection of short stories was published in 2011. His second short story collection, Fossil was published in 2013. He published a memoir titled Aksharganj in 2014. The memoir has 30 essays and contains various magical realism elements. In 2015, he wrote a play called Coma—A Political Sex. It was staged in Shilpee theatre and was directed by Yubraj Ghimire. The play is about a writer who goes into a coma while writing his book, because the constitution is not drafted on time.

His first novel, Mistika was published on 20 August 2015. On 2 October 2016, he published a collection of his fiction and non-fiction writings titled Ghatmandu. He published Docha, his memoir in 2017. The book was not written in first person narrative as with most memoir but used birds and inanimate objects as a narrator.

In 2018, he made a cameo in Lal Purja, a Nepali film. He also published Gya, a novel in the same year. He took 3 years to complete the book. The book was unveiled by Saguna Shah, a writer and founder of Bookaholics group, a Facebook readers group. The novel was shortlisted for the prestigious Madan Puraskar for the same year.

He wrote Bath-tub, a play in 2019. The play was staged in Shilpee theatre, directed by Yubaraj Ghimire and starred actor Neer Shah, writer Bhusita Vasistha and Brajesh.

He published his tenth book, Kalpa-Grantha on 27 March 2021. The book consisted of 63 experimental tales including typographs, postcards, screen plays, etc. The book was only sold to the preorders in a limited edition release. Many people criticise the hefty cost of the book and the limited release. The book was also shortlisted for Madan Puraskar but lost to Limbuwanko Etihasik Dastavej Sangraha by Bhagi Raj Ingnam.

He is also a columnist at Shilapatra online news portal. He describes himself as a fiction designer rather than fiction writer.

Notable works 
Books

Plays

Films

Personal life 
He is married to Sabitri Karki. They currently reside in Balkumari, Lalitpur with their son (Grishmil Nagarkoti).

See also 
 Nayan Raj Pandey
 Buddhisagar
 Saru Bhakta

References 

21st-century Nepalese male writers
21st-century Nepalese writers
Nepalese columnists
Nepalese male novelists
21st-century Nepalese poets
Living people
Newar people
1974 births
People from Lalitpur District, Nepal
Nepali-language writers from Nepal
Nepali-language poets